To You may refer to:

"To You" (1939 song), 1939 song composed by Tommy Dorsey with Benny Davis and Ted Shapiro
"To You" (Earth, Wind & Fire song), 2005
"To You", a 1979 song by Wings from Back to the Egg
"To You", a 2012 song in the Robin Schulz discography

See also

2U (disambiguation) 
 "To Ü", a song by Skrillex and Diplo from the 2015 album Skrillex and Diplo Present Jack Ü
You Too (disambiguation)